Alec Brook (1911-1986) was a male English international table tennis player.

Table tennis career
He won a bronze medal in the 1933 World Table Tennis Championships in the Swaythling Cup (men's team event) with Adrian Haydon, David Jones, Andrew Millar and Edward Rimer for England.

He appeared 500 times in exhibition matches at the London Palladium with Viktor Barna.

Personal profile
He was a chairman of the sports company Motif tie manufacturers ADB London Ltd which he established in 1946. He died in 1986.

See also
 List of England players at the World Team Table Tennis Championships
 List of World Table Tennis Championships medalists

References

English male table tennis players
1911 births
1986 deaths
World Table Tennis Championships medalists